Topsy: This One's for Basie is an album by American jazz group the Modern Jazz Quartet featuring performances recorded in 1985 and released on the Pablo label.

Reception
The Allmusic review stated "Overall this CD gives listeners a fine example of the music of The MJQ during the 1980s".

Track listing
All compositions by John Lewis except as indicated
 "Reunion Blues" (Milt Jackson) - 4:09    
 "Nature Boy" (eden ahbez) - 5:03    
 "Topsy Part 2" (Edgar Battle, Eddie Durham) - 4:40    
 "D and E" - 8:27    
 "Valeria" - 6:46    
 "Milano" - 5:50    
 "Le Cannet" - 8:16

Personnel
Milt Jackson - vibraphone
John Lewis - piano
Percy Heath - bass
Connie Kay - drums

References

Pablo Records albums
Modern Jazz Quartet albums
1985 albums